The electoral district of Murilla was a Legislative Assembly electorate in the state of Queensland, Australia.

History
Murilla was created by a redistribution, taking effect at the 1888 colonial election, and existed until the 1935 state election. It was based in the western Darling Downs adjoining the New South Wales border and included the localities of Taroom, Miles, Surat, Murilla and Goondiwindi.

When Murilla was abolished in 1935, its area was incorporated into the districts of Normanby, Dalby and Carnarvon.

Members

The following people were elected in the seat of Murilla:

Nelson previously represented Northern Downs (1883–1888).
Morgan subsequently represented Dalby (1935–1938).

References

Former electoral districts of Queensland
1888 establishments in Australia
1935 disestablishments in Australia
Constituencies established in 1888
Constituencies disestablished in 1935